Keir Waddington (born 1970) is professor of history at Cardiff University. He is a specialist in medical and environmental history. He is the joint editor of the Social Histories of Medicine monograph series.

Selected publications
 An introduction to the social history of medicine: Europe since 1500. Palgrave Macmillan, Basingstoke, 2011.
 The bovine scourge: neat, tuberculosis and public health, 1850-1914. Boydell Press, Woodbridge, 2006.
 Medical education at St. Bartholomew's hospital, 1123 - 1995. Boydell Press, Woodbridge, 2003.
 Charity and the London Hospitals, 1850-1898. Boydell & Brewer, Woodbridge, 2000. Royal Historical Society Studies in History New Series.

References

External links 

Living people
1970 births
Academics of Cardiff University
British medical historians